Embalse de Guadalcacín is a reservoir in the province of Cádiz, Andalusia, Spain.

Inside 

Inside there is a church, ermita de El Mibral and an old road restaurant

See also 
 List of reservoirs and dams in Andalusia

References

External links 
 Agencia del agua Junta de Andalucía 
 Reservoirs status summary 
 Confederación Hidrográfica del Guadalquivir 

Reservoirs in Andalusia